Christopher Lee Walsh (born December 12, 1968) is a former American football wide receiver who played 11 seasons in the National Football League for the Buffalo Bills and Minnesota Vikings. He played college football at Stanford University. Nicknamed The Undertaker, he once played an entire game with a broken jaw. He also was known for giving back to the community by visiting with fans and signing autographs at local Minnesota McDonald's restaurants.

Lawsuit against the NFL
In December 2011, Walsh made headlines when he and a group of 11 other former professional players filed a lawsuit against the NFL. Walsh and his attorneys allege that the League failed to properly treat head injuries in spite of prevailing medical evidence, leading the players to develop effects of brain injury ranging from chronic headaches to depression.

References

External links

1968 births
Living people
Players of American football from Cleveland
American football wide receivers
Stanford Cardinal football players
Buffalo Bills players
Minnesota Vikings players